The 2005 NCAA Division I baseball season, play of college baseball in the United States organized by the National Collegiate Athletic Association (NCAA) at the Division I level, began on January 21, 2005.  The season progressed through the regular season, many conference tournaments and championship series, and concluded with the 2005 NCAA Division I baseball tournament and 2005 College World Series.  The College World Series, which consisted of the eight remaining teams in the NCAA tournament, was held in its annual location of Omaha, Nebraska, at Rosenblatt Stadium.  It concluded on June 26, 2005, with the final game of the best of three championship series.  Texas defeated Florida two games to none to claim its sixth championship.

Realignment

New programs
Four programs joined Division I for the 2005 season, all of which joined from Division II.  The four new Division I members were Longwood, North Dakota State, South Dakota State, and UC Davis.

Dropped programs
Two programs left Division I following the 2004 season.  Pace, formerly an Independent, dropped to Division II.  Detroit, formerly a member of the Horizon League, discontinued its varsity baseball program.

Conference changes
The Atlantic Coast Conference added two members prior to the 2005 season.  Miami, previously an Independent, and Virginia Tech, previously a member of the Big East Conference, both joined the conference.

Division I's four new members, Longwood, North Dakota State, South Dakota State, and UC Davis, all became independents.

Conference standings

College World Series

The 2005 season marked the fifty ninth NCAA Baseball Tournament, which culminated with the eight team College World Series.  The College World Series was held in Omaha, Nebraska.  The eight teams played a double-elimination format, with Texas claiming their sixth championship with a two games to none series win over Florida in the final.

Bracket

Award winners

All-America team

References 

2005 Division I Standings at BoydsWorld.com